The Women's pentathlon event  at the 2006 IAAF World Indoor Championships was held on March 11.

Medalists

Results

60 metres hurdles

High jump

Shot put

Long jump

800 metres

Final results

References
Results

Pentathlon
Combined events at the World Athletics Indoor Championships
2006 in women's athletics